Moreau Lake State Park is a  state park in Saratoga County, New York, United States.

The park is located in the southwest part of the town of Moreau on US 9 off Interstate 87.

Winter activities include snowshoeing, cross-country skiing, skating and ice-fishing.  A historic cabin at the park was rehabilitated and turned into a winter warming lodge.

Summer activities include swimming in Moreau Lake, fishing, hiking, or paddling on the Hudson River.

Camping is available in the spring, summer, and fall.  Moreau Lake has 148 campsites, three cottages and a group camp for up to 35 people.  There are also pavilions for rent for parties, a concession stand, a nature center and a museum.

See also
 Mount McGregor
 List of New York state parks

References

External links

State parks of New York (state)
U.S. Route 9
Parks in Saratoga County, New York